Robert "Bobby" Berland (born November 5, 1961, in Chicago, Illinois) is an American judoka who competed in the 1984 Summer Olympics and in the 1988 Summer Olympics.

Berland is Jewish. In 1984 he won the silver in the under 86 kg (Middleweight) division. He was the first American and graduate of Mather High School to receive an Olympic silver medal in judo.

He also won a bronze medal in the 1983 World Judo Championships.

See also
 List of select Jewish judokas

References

External links
 
 
 
 US Olympic medalists in judo at JudoInfo.com

1961 births
Living people
American male judoka
Olympic judoka of the United States
Judoka at the 1984 Summer Olympics
Judoka at the 1988 Summer Olympics
Olympic silver medalists for the United States in judo
Medalists at the 1984 Summer Olympics
Pan American Games medalists in judo
Pan American Games silver medalists for the United States
Mather High School alumni
Judoka at the 1983 Pan American Games
Medalists at the 1983 Pan American Games